Robert Smyth (or Smythe) may refer to:

Robert Brough Smyth  (1830–1899), Australian geologist, author and social commentator
Sir Robert Smyth, 3rd Baronet, MP for Andover (UK Parliament constituency)
Sir Robert Smyth, 5th Baronet (1744–1802), MP for Colchester
Robert Smyth (American politician) (1814–1898), Irish-born American politician in Iowa
Several of the Smyth baronets
Robert Smyth Academy, upper school in Market Harborough, Leicestershire, England
Robert Sparrow Smythe (1833–1917), Australian journalist, newspaper editor/owner and theatrical manager

See also
Rob Smyth (born 1977), English rugby league player

Robert Smith (disambiguation)